Dominique is a unisex French name of Latin origin that means "of the Lord". 

Related names include Domaneke, Domanique, Domenica, Domeniga, Domenique, Domenico, Domonique, Dominike, Domineke, Dominga, Domingo, Domingos, Dominguinhos, Domini, Dominica, Dominika, Dominyka, Domino, Dominic, Domitia, and Domenika. Nicknames or shortened forms include Meeka, Mika, Nico, and Nikki.

People

First name
Dominique Baudis (1947–2014), French politician
Dominique Blanchar (1927–2018), French actress 
Dominique Crenn (born 1965), French chef
Dominique Dafney (born 1997), American football player
Dominique Dawes (born 1976), American gymnast
Dominique de Ménil (1908–1997), American art collector
Dominique de Villepin (born 1953), French politician and Prime Minister of France
Dominique Dorsey (born 1983), Canadian football player
Dominique Dunne (1959–1982), American actress
Dominique Faure (born 1959), French politician
Dominique Fernandez (born 1929), French writer
Dominique Guebey (born 1952), French racewalker
Dominique Harris (born 1987), American football player
Dominique Hatfield (born 1994), American football player
Dominique Horwitz (born 1957), German actor
Dominique Lapierre (born 1931), French author
Dominique Jackson (disambiguation), several people
Dominique Jean Larrey (1766–1842), French surgeon
 Dominique Jones (born 1994), American rapper
Dominique Malonga (born 1989), Congolese footballer
Dominique Mbonyumutwa (1921–1986), Rwandan politician and president
Dominique Michalon (born 1978), French singer
Dominique Moceanu (born 1981), American gymnast
Dominique Moïsi (born 1946), French political scientist
Dominique Monami (born 1973), Belgian tennis player
Dominique Moore (born 1986), British actress
Dominique Othenin-Girard (born 1958), Swiss film director
Dominique Pegg (born 1995), Canadian gymnast
Dominique Perrault (born 1953), French architect
Dominique Phinot (1510–1556), French composer 
Dominique Pinon (born 1955), French actor
Dominique Potier (born 1954), French politician
Dominique Prieur (born 1949), French military officer
Dominique Provost-Chalkley (born 1990), British-Canadian actor
Dominique Reiniche (born 1955), French businesswoman
Dominique Robinson (born 1998), American football player
Dominique Rocheteau (born 1955), French football player
Dominique Rodgers-Cromartie (born 1986), American football player
Dominique Sanda (born 1954), French actress and model
Dominique Sirop (born 1956), French fashion designer
Dominique Strauss-Kahn (born 1949), French economist and politician 
Dominique Swain (born 1980), American actress
Dominique Venner (1935–2013), French historian
Dominique Voynet (born 1958), French politician
Dominique Wilkins (born 1960), American basketball player

Surname
Andy Dominique (born 1975), American baseball player
Jean Dominique (1930–2000), Haitian journalist
Monica Dominique (born 1940), Swedish musician
Ronald Dominique (born 1964), American serial killer and rapist

Fiction
Dominique Derval, fictional character in the 1965 Bond film Thunderball
Dominique Deveraux, fictional character on the American television series Dynasty
Dominique Francon, fictional character in the Ayn Rand novel The Fountainhead
Dominique Weasley, fictional character in the Harry Potter series
Dominique Pierre, fictional character in the Netflix series Grand Army

Given names
Surnames
French unisex given names
Surnames of French origin
French-language surnames
French feminine given names
French masculine given names